Hardwick and Hardwicke are common place names in England—this is from the Old English pre-7th century word "heorde", meaning a "herd or flock", with "wic", which like the later Viking word "thorp" described an outlying farm or settlement, which was dependent on a larger village. In some cases, "Hardwick" and "Hardwicke" are interchangeable and the spelling has evolved over time.

Places

United Kingdom

 Hardwick, Buckinghamshire
 Hardwick, Cambridgeshire
 Hardwick Hall, Derbyshire, home of Bess of Hardwick
 Hardwick, County Durham
 Hardwick, Lincolnshire
 Hardwick, Monmouthshire
 Hardwick, Norfolk
 RAF Hardwick, Norfolk
 Hardwick, Northamptonshire
 Hardwick, Cherwell, Oxfordshire
 Hardwick, West Oxfordshire, Oxfordshire
 Hardwick, Rutland, a lost settlement in the United Kingdom
 Hardwick, Suffolk
 Hardwick, Walsall, an area in Walsall
 Hardwick Village, Nottinghamshire
 East Hardwick, West Yorkshire
 West Hardwick, West Yorkshire
 Kempston Hardwick, Bedfordshire
 Kites Hardwick, Warwickshire
 Priors Hardwick, Warwickshire

The Netherlands
 Harderwijk

United States
 Hardwick, California
 Hardwick, Baldwin County, Georgia
 Hardwick, Bryan County, Georgia
 Hardwick, Massachusetts
 Hardwick, Minnesota
 Hardwick, Vermont, a New England town
 Hardwick (CDP), Vermont, village in the town
 Hardwick Field, an airport in Tennessee
 Hardwick Township, New Jersey

Australia
 Hardwicke Street, New South Wales

Business
 Hardwick Clothes, the oldest manufacturer of tailor-made clothing in the United States
 Hardwick Stove Company, a former cooking appliance manufacturer merged with Maytag in 1981
 Hardwick and Woodbury Railroad, a former railroad in Vermont, U.S.A.

Other uses
 Hardwick (surname)
 Hardwicke (surname)
 Hardwick (appliances), a Maytag brand
 No 790 Hardwicke, a LNWR Improved Precedent Class speed-record-breaking steam engine during the Race to the North

See also
 Hartwick (disambiguation)
 Herdwick, a breed of sheep from the Lake District, England
 Hardwicke (disambiguation)